The Eyes of Thailand is a 2012 documentary film directed and produced by Windy Borman and produced by Tim VandeSteeg.  The film chronicles the work of Soraida Salwala, who opened the world's first elephant hospital (Friends of Asian Elephants Hospital) in Lampang, Thailand and together with her team, created the world's first elephant prosthesis.

Plot
The Eyes of Thailand tells the true story of Soraida Salwala's 10-year quest to help two elephant landmine survivors, Motala and Baby Mosha, walk again after losing their legs in landmine accidents.  Along with Soraida's efforts to care for the injured elephants and ultimately help them to walk again, the film also highlights the dangers posed by landmines.

Production
Director/Producer Windy Borman started making this film in 2007.  The film has gone through several revisions due to ongoing changes in the story of Motala and Mosha. Ashley Judd lends her voice as the film's narrator, saying about the film - "I hope it will raise awareness to protect Asian elephants—and all beings—from the terror of landmines."

Accolades

References

External links 
 
 

2012 films
2012 documentary films
American documentary films
Documentary films about animal rights
Films about elephants
Lampang province
Elephant conservation
Wildlife conservation in Thailand
Elephants in Thailand
2010s English-language films
2010s American films